Bonniwell is a surname. Notable people with the surname include:

 Al Bonniwell (1911–2002), American basketball player
 H. H. Bonniwell (1860–1935), American politician
 Norma Bonniwell (1877–1961), American architect
 Sean Bonniwell (1940–2011), American singer/songwriter
 William T. Bonniwell Jr. (1836–1889), American politician

English-language surnames